Mirití-Paraná is a town and municipality in the southern Colombian Department of Amazonas.

References
Gobernacion del Amazonas, Mirití-Paraná

Municipalities of Amazonas Department